Carolyn Darbyshire-McRorie (born December 6, 1963) is a Canadian curler from Calgary, Alberta. She played second for Cheryl Bernard from 2005–2011. She is currently the coach of Team Casey Scheidegger.

Career
Darbyshire-McRorie joined Bernard's team in 2005 after playing for Renelle Bryden. She has since won two provincial championships as a member of the team (2007 and 2009).

Darbyshire-McRorie played third for Heather Fowlie (Rankin) at the 2001 Canadian Olympic Curling Trials, and finished with a 4–5 record. As a member of team Bernard, Darbyshire-McRorie once again made it to the trials in 2009.

McRorie is known for her distinctive "Manitoba tuck" delivery while using a corn broom while delivering the rock.

On February 8, 2011, it was announced that the Bernard team would disband at the end of the 2010–2011 season. Carolyn has formed a team for the 2011/2012 season, She will skip the team with Marcy Balderston at third, Raylene Rocque, who previously played for Cathy King and retired at the end of the 2009–2010 season, will join the team at the second position and Karen McNamee playing lead.  She will also play alternate for Bernard when appropriate.

Although Darbyshire-McRorie has created a team for the 2011–12 season, she will be playing second stones for Shannon Kleibrink as of December 2011. The announcement was made during the 2011 Canada Cup of Curling. She will replace Bronwen Webster who is expecting her first child, and has decided to sit out the rest of the season.

Personal life
McRorie currently works as an office manager for Canadian Decal Installers. She is married and has one child.

References

External links
 

Curlers from Calgary
1963 births
Living people
Curlers at the 2010 Winter Olympics
Olympic silver medalists for Canada
Olympic curlers of Canada
Olympic medalists in curling
Medalists at the 2010 Winter Olympics
Canadian curling coaches
Canada Cup (curling) participants